Rundu Airport  is an airport serving Rundu, the capital of the Kavango Region in Namibia.

Runway 26 has an additional  of displaced threshold available for takeoff. There are no IFR procedures or equipment, but navigation is supported by an NDB north of the airport, across the border in Angola.

Airlines and destinations

The following airlines operate regular scheduled services at the airport:

See also
List of airports in Namibia
Transport in Namibia

References

External links
 
OpenStreetMap - Rundu
OurAirports - Rundu

Airports in Namibia
Rundu